The Curtiss O-52 Owl was an observation aircraft used by the United States Army Air Corps before and during World War II.

Design and development
Developed in 1939, the Curtiss O-52 was the last "heavy" observation aircraft developed for the US Army Air Corps. The concept of the two-seat observation aircraft, classed as the "O" series aircraft, dated to World War I, and in 1940, the Army Air Corps ordered 203 Curtiss O-52s for observation duties. By 1941, the O-52 was no match for modern combat conditions.

Operational history
Upon delivery, the aircraft was used in military maneuvers with the USAAC, but following America's entry into World War II, the USAAF determined that the aircraft did not possess sufficient performance for "modern" combat operations in overseas areas. As a result, the O-52 was relegated to courier duties within the U.S. and short-range submarine patrol over the Gulf of Mexico and Atlantic and Pacific Oceans.

The O-52 was the last "O" type aircraft procured in quantity for the Air Corps. Following the attack on Pearl Harbor, the "O" designation was discontinued and the "L" series for liaison-type aircraft was adopted instead.

In November 1942, the USSR ordered 30 O-52 Owls through the Lend-Lease program. Twenty-six were shipped, with only 19 delivered as a number were lost on the North Arctic Route. Of these only ten were accepted into service. They were used operationally for artillery fire spotting and general photographic and observation platforms in north and central areas on the Russian Front during spring–summer 1943. One O-52 was shot down by Luftwaffe fighters.  In the report on military tests, the Soviet pilots recognized that the American machine was superior to the outdated Polikarpov R-5, and Polikarpov R-Z spotters used at the front. The aircraft was generally disliked in Soviet use although some were still flying into the 1950s.

Operators

 Brazilian Air Force

 United States Army Air Corps

 Soviet Air Force

Surviving aircraft
 40-2746 – O-52 on static display at the Pima Air & Space Museum in Tucson, Arizona.
 40-2763 – O-52 on static display at the National Museum of the United States Air Force in Dayton, Ohio.
 40-2769 – O-52 on display at the Yanks Air Museum in Chino, California.
 40-2804 – O-52 under restoration in Huntington, Indiana. It was previously part of the Walter Soplata collection.

Specifications (O-52)

See also

References
Notes

Bibliography

 Donald, David. American Warplanes of World War II. London: Aerospace Publishing, 1995. . 
 Hardesty, Von. Red Phoenix: The Rise of Soviet Air Power 1941-1945. Washington, D.C.: Smithsonian Institution, 1991. .
 United States Air Force Museum Guidebook. Wright-Patterson AFB, Ohio: Air Force Museum Foundation, 1975.

External links

O-052
1940s United States military reconnaissance aircraft
Single-engined tractor aircraft
High-wing aircraft
Aircraft first flown in 1940